Dr. B.R. Ambedkar Stn., Vidhana Soudha is a station on the Purple Line of the Namma Metro in Bangalore, India. It was opened to the public on 30 April 2016.

History

Construction
The Dr. B.R. Ambedkar station, Vidhana Soudha, like all other underground stations on the Purple Line, was built using the cut-and-cover method. The contract to construct the station was awarded to CEC-Soma-CICI Joint Venture. RITES was the lead consultant on the project. Construction of the station required a total work area that was about 320 m long and 48 metres wide. A total area of 133,000 sq m (about 275 metres long and 27 metres wide) up to a depth of 18 metres had to be excavated to construct the station. The excavated soil could not be utilized in the construction process as it was mostly composed of rocky material. Instead, some of the fine quality soil obtained from the excavation at the Cubbon Park metro station, which had been stored on BRV Parade Grounds, was utilized. Fine soil was also obtained from other sources. The sand and smooth rock obtained from building tunnels was also used.

The station box is 13 metres long and 24 metres wide, and has no pillars. The design without pillars was chosen to enable free movement of commuters without obstruction, and for aesthetic reasons. In order to achieve the column-less design, the station box was constructed with strong concrete reinforcement. Its walls have a thickness of 1 metre, the concourse slab 0.75 metres thick, and the roof slab has thickness of 1.4 metres. The thick roof slab is designed bear the load of both the station box, and the soil above it. The roof of the station is located at a depth of 4 metres below ground level. To ensure uniformity in the construction of the walls, a specially fabricated steel gantry (10 m in width and 6 m in height) was used. The entire station box is covered with 3 mm thick bituminous membrane, a waterproofing agent, to prevent surface water from leaking into the station. After the station box was constructed, it was covered with up to 4 metres of good quality red soil. The rest of the excavated site was then refilled. After construction completed, the area was restored to its previous state by re-opening the 2-lane Dr. B.R. Ambedkar Road and the lawns in front of the Vidhana Soudha and Karnataka High Court.

Station name
On 14 April 2016, B. R. Ambedkar's 125th birth anniversary, it was announced that the proposed Vidhana Soudha metro station would be named Dr. B.R. Ambedkar station, Vidhana Soudha.

Station layout

Entry/Exits
There are 6 Entry/Exit points – A, B, C and D. Commuters can use either of the points for their travel.

 Entry/Exit point A: Towards Vidhana Soudha side or towards Indian Express (Bangalore)
 Entry/Exit point B: Towards High Court of Karnataka side
 Entry/Exit point C: Towards High Court of Karnataka side
 Entry/Exit point D: Towards Vidhana Soudha side or towards Reserve Bank of India (Bangalore) or towards Cubbon Park side
 Entry/Exit points E and F: Towards Vikasa Soudha side

See also
Bangalore
List of Namma Metro stations
Transport in Karnataka
List of metro systems
List of rapid transit systems in India
Bangalore Metropolitan Transport Corporation

References

External links

 Bangalore Metro Rail Corporation Ltd. (Official site) 
 UrbanRail.Net – descriptions of all metro systems in the world, each with a schematic map showing all stations.

Namma Metro stations
Railway stations in India opened in 2016
2016 establishments in Karnataka